Joseph Lee Kirby-Smith (April 16, 1882 – November 5, 1939) was an American college football player and dermatologist. He was once instructor of dermatology at New York University.

Early years
Kirby-Smith was born on April 16, 1882 in Sewanee, Tennessee, the son of American Civil War general Edmund Kirby-Smith and his wife Cassie Selden.

Sewanee
Kirby-Smith was an All-Southern tackle for the Sewanee Tigers of Sewanee:The University of the South, a member of its undefeated 1899 "Iron Men." He was selected All-Southern in 1902 and 1903;  and was captain in the latter year. He graduated with an M.D. in 1906. At Sewanee he was a member of the Phi Delta Theta fraternity.

World War I
Kirby-Smith served in the Public Health Service during the First World War.

Jacksonville
Kirby-Smith moved to Jacksonville, Florida in 1911, practicing as a dermatologist and gaining distinction throughout Florida and the south. In 1926, he was invited to lecture to the London Medical Association on the subject of tropical medicine.

Death
Kirby-Smith died in his Jacksonville home, on November 5, 1939, following a brief illness.

References

1882 births
1939 deaths
19th-century players of American football
American dermatologists
American football tackles
Sewanee Tigers football players
All-Southern college football players
People from Sewanee, Tennessee
Players of American football from Tennessee